Amber Kani (born 17 January 1991) is a New Zealand rugby league footballer who played for the New Zealand Warriors in the NRL Women's Premiership. 

Playing career
A Papakura Sisters junior, Kani has played for the Manurewa Marlins, Papatoetoe Panthers, Otara Scorpions and Papakura Sea Eagles in the Auckland Rugby League.

In 2012, she was named in the New Zealand Test train-on squad but they did not play a game that season. On 6 May 2016, Kani made her debut for New Zealand in their 26–16 Anzac Test win over Australia.

In 2017, she represented the Kiwi Ferns at the 2017 Women's Rugby League World Cup. She played all five matches for New Zealand, coming off the bench in their Final loss to Australia.

On 1 August 2018, Kani was named as a member of the New Zealand Warriors inaugural NRL Women's Premiership squad. In Round 2 of the 2018 NRL Women's season, she made her debut for the Warriors in a 10–22 loss to the St George Illawarra Dragons.

References

External links
NRL profile

1991 births
Living people
New Zealand Māori rugby league players
New Zealand female rugby league players
New Zealand women's national rugby league team players
New Zealand Warriors (NRLW) players